The Torridon Hills surround Torridon village in the Northwest Highlands of Scotland. The name is usually applied to the mountains to the north of Glen Torridon. They are among the most dramatic and spectacular peaks in the British Isles and made of some of the oldest rocks in the world.

Rock types
These are mainly made of a type of sandstone, known as Torridonian sandstone (see Geology of Great Britain), which over time  has become eroded to produce the unique characteristics of the Torridon Hills. In geology, Torridonian describes a series of proterozoic arenaceous sedimentary rocks of Precambrian age. They are amongst the oldest rocks in Britain, and sit on yet older rocks, Lewisian gneiss. Some of the highest peaks, such as Beinn Eighe are crowned by white Cambrian quartzite, which gives those peaks a distinctive appearance. Some of the quartzite contains fossilized worm burrows and known as pipe rock. It is circa 500 million years old. The strata are largely horizontal, and have weathered into terraces on the mountains.

Each of the Torridon Hills sits very much apart from one another, and they are often likened to castles. They have steep terraced sides, and broken summit crests, riven into many pinnacles. There are numerous steep gullies running down the terraced sides from the peaks. The summit ridges provide excellent scrambling, and are popular with hillwalkers and mountaineers. However, like many ridge routes, there are few escape points, so once committed, the scrambler or hillwalker must complete the entire ridge before descent.

There are numerous other mountains outside the immediate area of Loch Torridon which have the same characteristics, such as An Teallach near Ullapool.

Major peaks
Although many peaks in the Northwest Highlands exhibit Torridon geology, the Torridon hills are generally considered only to be those in the Torridon Forest to the north of Glen Torridon. Specifically, these are:

 Liathach
 Beinn Eighe
 Beinn Alligin
 Beinn Dearg
 Baosbheinn

Hills between Glen Torridon and Strath Carron share much of the splendour and character of the main hills, although perhaps less of the drama:
 Beinn Liath Mhòr
 Sgorr Ruadh
 Maol Cheann-dearg
 Beinn Damh
 An Ruadh-stac
 Fuar Tholl

The Torridon Hills exhibit some of the most dramatic mountain scenery in the British Isles, perhaps surpassed in grandeur only by the Cuillins of Skye.

See also
W A Poucher
Highlands of Scotland

External links
 Torridon at National Trust for Scotland

Mountains and hills of the Northwest Highlands
National Trust for Scotland properties
Torridon
Mountain ranges of Scotland